Grindsjön is a lake in Stockholm county, Södermanland, Sweden.

References

Lakes of Stockholm County